Yamchi-ye Olya (also Romanized as Yāmchī-ye ‘Olyā; also known as Yāmchī-ye Bālā, Yamchi Yukari, and Yamchī Yūkhārī) is a village in Rezaqoli-ye Qeshlaq Rural District, in the Central District of Nir County, Ardabil Province, Iran. At the 2006 census, its population was 233, in 63 families.

References 

Towns and villages in Nir County